Flight is an English-language opera in three acts, with music by Jonathan Dove and libretto by April De Angelis. Commissioned by Glyndebourne Opera, Glyndebourne Touring Opera premiered the work at Glyndebourne Opera House in a production by Richard Jones on 24 September 1998. It received its Glyndebourne Festival premiere with the original cast at Glyndebourne Festival Opera on 14 August 1999, and was revived at Glyndebourne in August 2005.

De Angelis took part of the inspiration for the plot from the true-life story of Mehran Karimi Nasseri, an Iranian refugee who lived at Charles de Gaulle Airport, Paris, for 18 years, unable to exit the airport terminal. Some of the same real events surrounding Nasseri were later used in the story for the 2004 Steven Spielberg film The Terminal, independently conceived after the opera.

Dove has also arranged music from Flight into an orchestral suite, titled Airport Scenes, for concert performances. This suite was first performed in Warwick on 7 March 2006.

Roles

Plot
The setting is the departure lounge of an unspecified airport. The opera takes place over the course of one full day and the following morning.

Act 1
In the airport, all of the characters are en route somewhere, except for the Controller, the Refugee, and the Immigration Officer. The Refugee cannot leave the airport because he does not have a passport or other documents to allow him to enter the country legally. The Immigration Officer looks for the Refugee in order to arrest him. Married couple Bill and Tina are going on holiday to try to get their relationship out of its routine with the help of a sex manual. The Older Woman, appearing in disguise, has come to the terminal to wait for her "fiancé"—a younger man that has promised to meet her. Minskman is a diplomat relocating for an assignment, and his wife, Minskwoman, is pregnant and on the brink of childbirth. The Stewardess and Steward, when not serving the customers, enjoy a vibrant physical relationship. At the last minute, Minskwoman is afraid to fly, and Minskman goes to his destination without his wife. The Flight Controller warns of approaching storms. The Older Woman's fiancé has not arrived, and Bill and Tina prepare to depart. As Act I closes, all of the characters are suddenly delayed and stranded at the airport because of the inclement weather.

Act 2
The time is during the night, just after the storm has "gotten worse" and grounded all the planes. After all the characters have gone to sleep, Bill, in an attempt to break out of his "predictable" nature, makes a pass at the Stewardess, but is shocked to find the Steward instead. The two of them agree to venture up to the heights of the control tower. The Flight Controller grapples with the lack of planes and verbally assaults the storm outside her tower. The Refugee tries to insinuate himself with the various women and gives them (at various points throughout the act) each a "magic stone" that he says will cure their individual travails. The women toast their good fortune and drink with the Refugee. Eventually, as the storm builds, the drunk women realize that the Refugee has given them all the same "magic stone" and turn on him in a fit of rage, knocking him unconscious and concealing his body within a trunk. Up above in the tower, Bill and the Steward engage in an explorative sexual affair.

Act 3
It is dawn; the storm has cleared, and every character reels from the events of the previous night. The controller announces the sudden arrival of a plane. Minskman has returned suddenly on the first available flight back, unable to continue without his wife at his side. When Tina learns of Bill's sexual encounter, she is enraged and angrily strikes him with the sex manual, knocking him unconscious as well. The Minskwoman suddenly goes into labor and delivers her baby in the terminal, just as the Refugee awakes from the trunk. The characters, with the insight of newborn life, reflect on the problems in their lives and offer forgiveness to each other for their wrongs. The Immigration Officer finally catches up with the Refugee. The passengers divide into two camps, one demanding the arrest of the Refugee, with the other trying to persuade the Immigration Officer to "review the situation". The Immigration Officer is implacable, citing the need to observe the rules. The Refugee then tells his story, which explains why he has no documentation. His story touches the passengers, and also the Immigration Officer. The officer says that the Refugee cannot leave the terminal, but also that he will "turn a blind eye" and not arrest him.

With the storm cleared, Minskman and Minskwoman, with their new baby, fly to his new mission. Tina, taking the opportunity to start fresh with her husband Bill, go to their respective vacation destination. The Older Woman decides to venture out on a flight herself. The Steward and Stewardess make amends, each working on their respective flights. The opera ends with an enigmatic inquiry from the Controller to the Refugee.

Recording
The opera has been recorded commercially for Chandos, taken from the live Channel 4 television broadcast from Glyndebourne.

Selected list of stagings

See also
 List of people who have lived at airports
 Lost in Transit, 1993 film
 The Terminal, 2004 film
 Eve Bunting, whose illustrated 1991 children's book Fly Away Home is about a homeless man and his son who live in an airport

References

External links
 Work details, Edition Peters
 Michael Magnusson, "Dove: Flight'''". Opera Today'' blog, 9 March 2006
 Robert Hughill, "Snappily Executed". Music & Vision blog, March 2008
 2004 recording release, Chandos Records

English-language operas
Operas by Jonathan Dove
1998 operas
Operas
Operas set in France
Operas set in the 20th century
Operas set in the 21st century
Aviation plays and operas